A popular front is a term for a political coalition which is commonly made up of parties ranging ideologically from liberalism to communism, historically for the purpose of opposing the rise of fascism or far-right politics in general. In Post-Soviet states, the word has a different meaning, instead connoting a liberal intellectual organization formed to support self-determination for the territory in which it operated.  

Popular Front may refer to:

Political movements 
Alliance of the Christian Democratic Popular Front
Azerbaijani Popular Front Party
Belarusian Popular Front
Broad Popular Front, a small Panamanian left-of-center political party, 1977-1984. 
Comorian Popular Front
Humanist Popular Front, a center-left Venezuelan political party formed in 2009.
Ivorian Popular Front
Mauritanian Popular Front
Popular Democratic Front (Italy)
Popular Front (Burkina Faso)
Popular Front (Chile)
Popular Front (France)
Popular Front (Senegal)
Popular Front (Spain)
Popular Front (Tunisia)
Popular Front (UK)
Popular Front for Armed Resistance
Popular Front for Change and Liberation
Popular Front for Democracy, the main opposition political party in Ghana during the Third Republic (1979-1981). 
Popular Front for Recovery, a militia from Chad.
Popular Front for the Liberation of Bahrain
Popular Front for the Liberation of Chad
Popular Front for the Liberation of Libya
Popular Front for the Liberation of Oman
Popular Front for the Liberation of Palestine
Popular Front for the Liberation of Palestine – External Operations
Popular Front for the Liberation of Palestine – General Command
Popular Front for the Liberation of Palestine – Special Command
Popular Front for the Liberation of the Occupied Arabian Gulf
Popular Front of Estonia
Popular Front of India
Popular Front of Latvia
Popular Front of Moldova
Popular Front of Potosí
Popular Front of the Canary Islands
Popular Front Party
Popular Revolutionary Front for the Liberation of Palestine
Unified Popular Front, a political party in Iraq.
United Popular Front, a Greek political party founded in July 2011.
United Popular Front (Iraq)
Whole Azerbaijan Popular Front Party
Worker Peasant Student and Popular Front

Media 

 Popular Front, an independent media outlet and podcast founded by British journalist Jake Hanrahan

See also
Popular Democratic Front (disambiguation)
Popular Liberation Front (disambiguation)
People's Front (disambiguation)